Lake Buyo is an artificial lake in western Côte d'Ivoire on the Sassandra River. It was formed by the construction of the Buyo Dam at Buyo in 1980.

The water quality of the lake has suffered from disposal of untreated effluents and overuse of fertilizers in the surrounding areas.

References

Buyo
Bas-Sassandra District